The Detroit Red Wings are a professional ice hockey team based in Detroit, Michigan. They are members of the Atlantic Division in the Eastern Conference of the National Hockey League (NHL) and are one of the "Original Six" teams of the league. The franchise and its members have won numerous team and individual awards and honors. The first team trophy acquired by the club was the Prince of Wales Trophy in 1934, at the time awarded to the champion of the American Division.  Their most recent team trophy was the Clarence S. Campbell Bowl in 2009, taken in honor of being the champions of the Western Conference. The team has captured the Stanley Cup as league champion eleven times, most recently in 2008.

Gordie Howe is the team's most decorated player, with six wins each of the Art Ross Trophy as regular season scoring leader and the Hart Memorial Trophy as regular season most valuable player (MVP), twenty-one selections to the First and Second Team All-Stars (the most in league history), twenty-two appearances in the All-Star Game, the Lester Patrick Trophy for outstanding contributions to the sport in the United States, and the NHL Lifetime Achievement Award for long term contributions to hockey.  Nicklas Lidstrom has the most awards of any defenseman, having once won the Conn Smythe Trophy as post season MVP to go along with having won the James Norris Memorial Trophy (Norris Trophy) seven times as the best defenseman in the league as well as twelve selections to the First and Second Team All-Stars and twelve selections to the All-Star Game. Terry Sawchuk leads goaltenders with three wins of the Vezina Trophy as the league's best goaltender, seven selections to the First and Second Team All-Stars, seven selections to the All-Star Game, the Lester Patrick Trophy, and the Calder Memorial Trophy as the league's best rookie. Howe, Lidstrom, and Sawchuk have all had their uniform number retired by the team and have all been inducted into the Hockey Hall of Fame.

Three Red Wings have been the inaugural recipient of an award and three awards are named in honor of former Red Wings.  In 1932 Carl Voss was named the first winner of the Calder Memorial Trophy.  The first time the Norris Trophy was awarded was in 1954, when Red Kelly won.  In 2007 Chris Chelios was named the first annual winner of the Mark Messier Leadership Award, the award previously having been given on a monthly basis. The Jack Adams Award, given to the best coach, is named for Jack Adams, long-time head coach and general manager of the club.  The Norris Trophy takes its name from James E. Norris, who owned the club from 1932 to 1952.  In 2010, the Lester B. Pearson Award was renamed the Ted Lindsay Award to recognize Ted Lindsay "for his skill, tenacity, leadership, and for his role in establishing the original Players' Association."

League awards

Team trophies
The Detroit Red Wings have won the O'Brien Trophy five times, the Clarence S. Campbell Bowl and the Presidents' Trophy six times each, the Stanley Cup eleven times, and the Prince of Wales Trophy thirteen times.

Individual awards
Many members of the Red Wings organization have received individual awards from the league. The Lady Byng Memorial Trophy has been won fourteen times by seven different players in recognition of their gentlemanly play; Pavel Datsyuk has won four times while Red Kelly and Alex Delvecchio have each won three times.  The Hart Memorial Trophy, for most valuable player, and the James Norris Memorial Trophy, awarded to the league's best defenseman, have each been won nine times.  Gordie Howe won the Hart six times and Nicklas Lidstrom won the Norris seven times.   Three coaches have been honored with the Jack Adams Award a total of four times; Jacques Demers is the only person to have won the award in consecutive years as well as being the only coach to win twice with the same team.

All-Stars

NHL first and second team All-Stars

The NHL first and second team All-Stars are the top players at each position as voted on by the Professional Hockey Writers' Association. Gordie Howe has been selected twenty-one times, more than any other player in league history.

NHL All-Rookie Team

The NHL All-Rookie Team consists of the top rookies at each position as voted on by the Professional Hockey Writers' Association. Steve Yzerman was the first Red Wing selected, in the 1983–84 season. Goaltender Jimmy Howard is the most recently selected player, having been named to the team in 2009–10.

All-Star Game selections
The National Hockey League All-Star Game is a mid-season exhibition game held annually between many of the top players of each season. Sixty-four All-Star Games have been held since 1947, with at least one player chosen to represent the Red Wings in each year. The All-Star game has not been held in various years: 1979 and 1987 due to the 1979 Challenge Cup and Rendez-vous '87 series between the NHL and the Soviet national team, respectively, 1995, 2005, and 2013 as a result of labor stoppages, 2006, 2010, and 2014 because of the Winter Olympic Games, and 2021 as a result of the COVID-19 pandemic.

Detroit has hosted five of the games. The 4th, 6th, 8th, and 9th games all took place at the Detroit Olympia. On October 8, 1950 the Red Wings, winner of the 1950 Stanley Cup Finals, played a team of All-Stars in the 4th All-Star Game. Only 9,166 people attended the game, making it is the smallest attendance figure in All-Star Game history. Ted Lindsay scored the first hat trick in an All-Star Game, as the Red Wings won 7–1. The 6th All-Star Game was held on October 5, 1952. For the second year in a row, the format had the First and Second Team All-Stars, with additional players on each team, play each other. After the game ended in a tie for the second year in a row, the NHL decided that they would continue with the previous format of the Stanley Cup winner playing an all-star team. The Red Wings won both the 1954 Stanley Cup Finals and the 1955 Stanley Cup Finals and so hosted the 8th and 9th All-Star Games, each on October 2.  The 1954 match ended in a 2–2 tie while the Red Wings won the 1955 game by a score of 3–1. The 32nd National Hockey League All-Star Game  was held at Joe Louis Arena in Detroit on February 5, 1980. The Wales Conference all-star team won for the fifth consecutive time. Gordie Howe, then of the Hartford Whalers, appeared in his twenty-third and final All-Star game, his first twenty-two coming during his career in Detroit.

All-Star benefit games
Prior to the institution of the National Hockey League All-Star Game the league held three different benefit games featuring teams of all-stars.  The first was the Ace Bailey Benefit Game, held in 1934, after a violent collision with Eddie Shore of the Boston Bruins left Ace Bailey of the Toronto Maple Leafs hospitalized and unable to continue his playing career.  In 1937 the Howie Morenz Memorial Game was held to raise money for the family of Howie Morenz of the Montreal Canadiens who died from complications after being admitted to the hospital for a broken leg.  The Babe Siebert Memorial Game was held in 1939 to raise funds for the family of the Canadiens' Babe Siebert who drowned shortly after he retired from playing.

Career achievements

Hockey Hall of Fame
Many members of the Red Wings organization have been inducted into the Hockey Hall of Fame.  This list includes all personnel who have ever been employed by the Detroit Red Wings in any capacity and have also been inducted into the Hockey Hall of Fame.

Lester Patrick Trophy
Twenty-five members of the Red Wings organization have been honored with the Lester Patrick Trophy. The trophy has been presented by the National Hockey League and USA Hockey since 1966 to honor a recipient's contribution to ice hockey in the United States. This list includes all personnel who have ever been employed by the Detroit Red Wings in any capacity and have also received the Lester Patrick Trophy.

Foster Hewitt Memorial Award
Four members of the Red Wings organization have been honored with the Foster Hewitt Memorial Award. The award is presented by the Hockey Hall of Fame to members of the radio and television industry who make outstanding contributions to their profession and the game of ice hockey during their broadcasting career.

Retired numbers
The Detroit Red Wings have retired eight numbers, which means that no player can use those uniform numbers again while part of the team. All of those players have been inducted into the Hockey Hall of Fame. The most recently retired number is that of Red Kelly, whose number was retired on February 1, 2019.

The Red Wings have also made the number 6 of Larry Aurie and the number 16 of Vladimir Konstantinov no longer available for issue. However, the numbers are not considered to be officially retired. Although Aurie's uniform was retired in 1938 by James E. Norris, current team owner Mike Ilitch does not consider the number to be retired. Konstantinov's number has not been issued to any player since he was permanently disabled in a vehicle accident after the 1997 Stanley Cup Finals. Number 99 is also unavailable due to having been retired by the league in honor of Wayne Gretzky.

Other awards

Members of the club have also won various non-league awards that are designated for or typically given to NHL players.  Bobby Baun was awarded the Charlie Conacher Humanitarian Award in 1970 for his work in the community.  Pavel Datsyuk has won the Kharlamov Trophy as the best Russian in the league while Nicklas Lidstrom and Henrik Zetterberg have been recognized as the best Swede in the league with the Viking Award.

See also
List of National Hockey League awards
List of NHL retired numbers
List of members of the Hockey Hall of Fame
List of Stanley Cup champions

Footnotes
 From 1993–94 through 2012–13, the Red Wings were members of the Western Conference.   The NHL realigned prior to the 2013–14 season and the Red Wings were placed in the Atlantic Division of the Eastern Conference.
 From 1927–28 through 1937–38, the Prince of Wales Trophy was awarded to the regular season champion of the American Division.   From 1938-39 until 1966-67, the NHL had no divisions, and the trophy was given to the regular season champion of the league. The trophy is currently presented to the post season champion of the Eastern Conference.
 Jack Adams was head coach of the Red Wings from 1927–28 to 1946–47 and was also general manager of the team from 1927–28 to 1961–62.
 Keith Allen played for the Red Wings during the 1953–54 and 1954–55 seasons.  
 Al Arbour played for the Red Wings during the 1953–54, 1955–56, 1956–57, and 1957–58 seasons.  
 Murray Costello played for the Red Wings during the 1955–56 and 1956–57 seasons. 
 Brian Kilrea played for the Red Wings during the 1957–58 season.
 Bud Poile played for the Red Wings during the 1948–49 season.
 Carl Voss played for the Red Wings during the 1932–33 and 1933–34 seasons.

Notes

References

External links
 Detroit Red Wings official website

Detroit Red Wings
award
award